Herschel Sparber (born October 18, 1943) is an American actor and Broadway performer. He is unusually tall, at 6 feet, 9 inches.

Early life
Sparber was born in Gary, Indiana on October 18, 1943.

Career
A few of his standout roles include the role of Big Jule in Broadway's revival of Guys and Dolls with Nathan Lane and Faith Prince, playing the President of the United Federation of Planets, Jaresh-Inyo, in a pair of episodes of TV's Star Trek: Deep Space Nine, acting in several TV shows and specials, including a recurring character on Boy Meets World, and a multi-episode role in NYPD Blue.

Sparber is doing voices for video game characters, cartoons, and did a brief dub-over in the 2005 movie Serenity.

Filmography

Film

Television

References

External links
 

1943 births
Living people
American male film actors
American male television actors
American male voice actors
Male actors from Indiana
People from Gary, Indiana